The Criminal Quartet is a 1989 Soviet action film directed by Aleksandr Muratov.

Plot 
The investigator discovers a large consignment of defective shoes at the trading base and starts a case about this. Suddenly his son disappears. Soon the bell rings. The kidnappers demand that he close the case if he wants to see his son alive.

The hero tells this to his friends, two operatives and a journalist. They have been friends since the orphanage and are ready to do anything for a friend! Four fearless men challenge the mafia.

Cast 
 Nikolai Karachentsov as Marat
 Vladimir Steklov as Semyon Portnoi, Investigator
 Boris Shcherbakov as Pyotr Sarayev  
 Vladimir Yeryomin as Nikolay Larin
 Semyon Farada as Levkoev
 Oleg Anofriev	as 	Matvey Iosifovich Feldman
 Alexey Sheynin as factory chief technologist
 Yuriy Katin-Yartsev as Semyon Moiseevich
 Nele Savichenko-Klimene as Lyusya, Portnoi's wife
 Boris Klyuyev as factory chief engineer
 Lev Prygunov as Lev
 Yuriy Nazarov as Dmitry, police officer
 Igor Yasulovich as Shakalov
 Vadim Spiridonov as Lobanov
 Ivan Muradkhanov as Anton, Portnoi's son

Awards
 Cognac Festival du Film Policier (1990) — Audience Award

References

External links 
 

1989 films
1980s crime action films
1980s Russian-language films
Soviet crime action films
Mosfilm films